Ortigalita Creek, formerly Arroyo de Las Ortigalito (Little Nettle Creek) is a tributary stream of the San Joaquin River, in Merced County, California. The source of Ortigalita Creek is at  located near a peak on the Ortigalita Ridge of the Diablo Range. Originally in years of heavy winter rainfall it may have reached the vicinity of the Mud Slough of the San Joaquin River.

History 
Arroyo de Las Ortigalito was a watering place on El Camino Viejo in the San Joaquin Valley between Arroyo de los Baños and Arroyita de Panoche.  Arroyo de Las Ortigalito also was the southern boundary of Rancho Panoche de San Juan y Los Carrisolitos.

References

See also
List of rivers of California

Rivers of Merced County, California
Tributaries of the San Joaquin River
Diablo Range
Geography of the San Joaquin Valley
El Camino Viejo
Rivers of Northern California